Sid Goodwin (1914–1980) was an Australian rugby league footballer who played in the 1930s and 1940s. Goodwin played 11 seasons for the Balmain club between 1933–1942 then moved to the Newtown club for 3 seasons between 1943–1945. He was selected to play for New South Wales in 1938, 1939, 1940 and 1944.

Balmain
In 1935, Goodwin took Balmain's club record for most tries in a match with 5 against University on 4 April. Also in 1935, he was also selected to represent Australia in all three Tests against New Zealand. He is listed on the Australian Players Register as kangaroo No. 199. In 1936 he played in his first Grand Final, scoring a try in Balmain's loss to Easts.
In 1939 Goodwin was the premiership's top try-scorer and also captained the Balmain side that won the 1939 Grand Final. By the time he left Balmain he'd set the club's records for most tries in a season and most career tries. Goodwin was inducted into the Balmain Tigers Hall of Fame on 20 March 2007.

Newtown
After moving to Newtown in 1943, Goodwin enjoyed further premiership success in NSWRFL season 1943, scoring a double in that year's Grand Final. He was again the League's top try-scorer in 1943 and 1944. In 1944 he again played for Newtown in the Grand Final, but failed to win against his old club, Balmain.

Post-playing
Goodwin lived for most of his life in Marrickville, New South Wales, but moved to Windang, New South Wales in his retirement. He died there on 24 March 1980, age 65. He was cremated at Wollongong Crematorium on 26 March 1980.

Sources

External links
Balmain in the 1930s at tigers.org.au
Sid Goodwin at yesterdayshero.com.au

1914 births
1980 deaths
Australian rugby league players
Balmain Tigers players
Australia national rugby league team players
New South Wales rugby league team players
City New South Wales rugby league team players
Newtown Jets players
Rugby league wingers
Rugby league players from Sydney